The Jodhpur Ring Road is a road project aimed at connecting the highways surrounding the cities of  Jaipur, Nagaur, Jaisalmer, Barmer and Pali in the state of Rajasthan, India.

Construction 
In January 2019, the Minister of Road Transport and Highways Nitin Gadkari and Ministrer of Water Resources, River Development and Ganga Rejuvenation Gajendra Singh Shekhawat laid the foundation stones for the Jodhpur Ring Road. Work stalled in January 2021 due to financial constraints. In September 2021, the NHAI invited bids for Package II of designed length of 30 km which was further awarded to OSS Construction in JV with Spetsdorstroy LLC. Work resumed in April 2022, with a new contractor for the first phase of 45 km; the tender for the second phase of 30 km was also awarded.

References 

Roads in Rajasthan
Transport in Jodhpur
Ring roads in India